A Marriage During the Regency is a ballet in 2 acts, with libretto and choreography by Marius Petipa and music by Cesare Pugni.

The ballet was first presented by the Imperial Ballet on December 18/30 (Julian/Gregorian calendar dates), 1858, at the Imperial Bolshoi Kamenny Theatre in St. Petersburg, Russia. Principal dancers: Mariia Surovshchikova-Petipa (as the Countess Matilda) and Christian Johansson (as the Count), Timofei Stukolkin, Marfa Muravyova, Anna Prikhunova, and Lev Ivanov.

In 1870 Marius Petipa restaged this ballet at the Mariinsky Theatre.

References

Ballets by Marius Petipa
Ballets by Cesare Pugni
1858 ballet premieres
Ballets premiered at the Bolshoi Theatre, Saint Petersburg